The Autopista AP-61 (also known as Autopista Segovia - San Rafael) is an autopista in the province of Segovia, in the community of Castile and León, Spain. It starts at the Autopista AP-6 near the village of San Rafael and ends at the SG-20 (originally part of the N-110) on the southern outskirts of the city of Segovia, while running parallel to the N-603. It opened in 2004.

References

Transport in Castile and León
Autopistas and autovías in Spain